Paul Khomich (Belarusian: Paval Homich, 17 October 1893, Volkovysk, Grodno Region – died on 10 September 1942, Saint Petersburg, now Russian Federation) was a priest of the Roman Catholic Church, the head of the Apostolic Administration of Leningrad.

Family and education

Born into a family of an employee of the district treasury belonging to the Russian Orthodox Church and being baptized Orthodox, Khomich converted to Catholicism in 1905 (when the adoption of the Decree on religious tolerance transition from Orthodoxy to another religion is no more a criminal offense, a lot of people whose ancestors were Roman Catholic or Greek Catholics have left the Orthodox Church).
He graduated from Catholic Petrograd Theological Seminary (1916), studied at the Catholic Theological Academy of Petrograd, which was not completed due to its closure in 1918.

The beginning of the church

Since 1916 Khomich was a Catholic priest, served in Petrograd and Vyritsa. Since 1920 he became head of the Church of the Holy Trinity in Pskov, also conducted services in the branch chapels Island, Day and Porkhov.
In 1923 many members of the Catholic clergy of Petrograd were arrested. At this time, a young priest from Pskov became the rector of Saint Casimir's Church in Saint Petersburg, and then as administrator of Our Lady of Czestochowa Church in Ligovo and Saint Alexis in Peterhof. Khomich has worked with youth, organizing for her educational and religious circles, teaching young people the law of God. Also led to his parish community of Franciscan laymen, which at that time about 40 people. In 1926 headed the third Franciscan order in Leningrad, which consisted of several hundred people.

In prison and exile

In December 1926 he was arrested, briefly released soon, but in January 1927 was arrested again. Initially sentenced to three years in prison, and on 27 June 1927 followed by a new sentence of 10 years in prison on charges of "counter-revolutionary religious conduct activities among the youth and the faithful of the parish, as well as the creation of an illegal anti-Soviet brotherhood member of the Third Order Franciscan." On 3 July 1927 was in the Solovki prison camp. Participated in church services held in Herman, preached in Polish and Russian. Unofficially Khomich was considered the head of the community of Catholic priests of the Latin Rite. After the ban of worship continued to serve Mass in secret. In March 1929, along with other Catholic priests, was transferred to a penal trip to the Anzer island, where he was held under harsh conditions. Despite this he continued to celebrate mass daily.
In 1932 was one of the players of the next case against Catholic priests accused of anti-Soviet propaganda among the prisoners – one of the main charges were conducting secret worship. Also priests accused of being "influenced by other prisoners – Catholics by giving cash benefits of amounts received from their colleagues and organizations in the wild in the form of remittances, led talks on religious subjects, recruiting in this way like-minded people in the camp ". During the interrogation, said: "In my letters, I emphasized the fact that he is satisfied with his lot, that is what my God said that bear suffering, enhancing feelings of believers."
Khomich was transferred to the prison in Leningrad on 27 May 1933, sentenced to a year of punishment cells and was imprisoned in Siverskoye camps, the Far East, and from 1935 to 1936 again at Solovki prison camp.

In recent years, the secret service

In November 1936 Khomich was released. He lived in the cities of Kostroma, Kaluga and in Siberia. In August 1939 in Leningrad, continued secretly to serve. From 1941 to 1942 secretly take care of the Apostolic Administration of Leningrad. Together with his parishioners remained in the city during the siege.

The last arrest and death

On 15 July 1942, at the re-registration of passports has been arrested, accused of organizing the underground church, anti-Soviet and defeatist propaganda and defamation of the Soviet government. On 1 September 1942, was sentenced to death, nine days later the sentence was carried out Kolmich died.

Beatification

In 2003 officially began the process of beatification of Paul Khomich.

References

External links
 catholicmartyrs – о. Павел Хомич
 Catholic.ru – Католическая Россия :: Хомич Павел Семенович
 slounik.org: Хоміч Павал
 ХОМІЧ Павел Сямёнавіч

Converts to Roman Catholicism
Converts to Roman Catholicism from Eastern Orthodoxy
Former Belarusian Orthodox Christians
1893 births
1942 deaths
Belarusian Roman Catholic priests
Servants of God
People from Vawkavysk
20th-century Roman Catholic priests
People executed by the Soviet Union